Ruthiella is a genus of plants in the Campanulaceae. It contains 4 known species, all endemic to New Guinea.

Ruthiella oblongifolia (Diels) Steenis
Ruthiella saxicola (P.Royen) Steenis
Ruthiella schlechteri (Diels) Steenis
Ruthiella subcordata (Merr. & L.M.Perry) Steenis

References

Lobelioideae
Endemic flora of New Guinea
Campanulaceae genera